Indian School Darsait is an Indian School in Muscat, under the supervision of the Indian Embassy in Oman. This school is affiliated to Central Board of Secondary Education Of India. It is located in Darsait, Muscat, in the Sultanate of Oman.

History 
Indian School Darsait was initially set up as the Kerala State Board Syllabus Stream (KSBS) of Indian School Muscat in July 1992.

In 2004, the school management decided to run a parallel CBSE stream. Later, the KSBS stream was discontinued and the school continued as a full-fledged CBSE affiliated school.
It is the only Indian Community School in Oman that received NABET accreditation.

Academics 
The school follows syllabi prescribed by the Central Board of Secondary Education (CBSE) and offers Physics, Chemistry, Mathematics, Computer Science, Informatics Practices, Biology, Accountancy, Business Studies, Economics, Psychology, Painting, Physical Education and Marketing as elective subjects in addition to the core subjects like English to the students of Classes XI and XII.

Student Council

References

External links 
 http://timesofoman.com/article/110486/Oman/Education/Indian-School-Darsait-exuberant-over-Class-X-results.

Indian international schools in Oman